John Gunne (fl. 1397) was an English politician.

He was a Member (MP) of the Parliament of England for Totnes in January 1397.

References

Year of birth missing
Year of death missing
English MPs January 1397
Members of the Parliament of England (pre-1707) for Totnes